Honrarás a los tuyos may refer to:
 Honrarás a los tuyos (1959 TV series), a Mexican telenovela
 Honrarás a los tuyos (1979 TV series), a Mexican telenovela